Belligatti is a village in Dharwad district of Karnataka, India.

Demographics 
As of the 2011 Census of India there were 28 households in Belligatti and a total population of 151 consisting of 78 males and 73 females. There were 25 children ages 0-6.

References

Villages in Dharwad district